The Thomas Helms Verlag is a specialist publisher for North German culture, monument preservation, local and regional history, history, church and art history and is based in Schwerin in Mecklenburg-Western Pomerania.

History 
In 1994, the publishing house was founded by the Schwerin photographer Thomas Helms who by then had already created the illustrations for many books. His focus is on architectural photography, and he is particularly interested in the history and regional studies of Mecklenburg and Pomerania.

References

External links 
 

Companies based in Mecklenburg-Western Pomerania
German companies established in 1994
German editors